Sean Kaley (born 26 February 1975) is a Canadian long-distance runner. He competed in the men's 10,000 metres at the 2000 Summer Olympics.

References

External links
 

1975 births
Living people
Athletes (track and field) at the 2000 Summer Olympics
Canadian male long-distance runners
Olympic track and field athletes of Canada
Athletes (track and field) at the 1999 Pan American Games
Pan American Games track and field athletes for Canada
Athletes (track and field) at the 2002 Commonwealth Games
Commonwealth Games competitors for Canada
Athletes from Montreal